Anthonomus aeneolus is a species of true weevil in the beetle family Curculionidae. It is found in North America. It normally develops within the flower buds of Solanum flowers, although eggs can be laid within galls on the plant. Larvae feed on the anthers of the flowers.

References

Further reading

External links

 

Curculioninae
Articles created by Qbugbot
Beetles described in 1891